Omutskoye is a rural locality (a selo) in Kiprinsky Selsoviet, Shelabolikhinsky District, Altai Krai, Russia. The population was 413 as of 2013. There are 9 streets.

Geography 
Omutskoye is located 33 km west of Shelabolikha (the district's administrative centre) by road. Novosyolovka is the nearest rural locality.

References 

Rural localities in Shelabolikhinsky District